This is a discography of works by Jimmy Nail. Since 1985, the British musician has released a total of seven studio albums, multiple singles and other works. This article also covers his works alongside musicians such as Mark Knopfler.

Albums

Studio albums

Compilation albums

Soundtrack albums

Singles

Notes
'*^ "Ain't No Doubt" did not chart on the Finnish Singles Chart, but it charted instead on the Finnish Airplay Chart.

Featured artist

Videos

References

Discographies of British artists
Rock music discographies